The Counts of Villafranca and later the Counts of Villafranca-Soissons are legitimate male line descendants of Thomas Francis, Prince of Carignano the founder of the Carignano line of the House of Savoy. The title was created in 1778 for Prince Eugenio of Savoy (1753–1785). The third count Prince Eugenio Emanuele married in 1863 to Felicita Crosio (1844–1911) in what was a morganatic marriage. His wife was created Countess of Villafranca-Soissons in 1888 so the descendants of the marriage bear the title Count/Countess of Villafranca-Soissons. The current head of the Villafranca-Soissons line is Count Edoardo Emanuele Filiberto (born 1945) the grandson of the first count of Villafranca-Soissons via his second son Count Giuseppe Carlo (1904–1971).

Counts of Villafranca (1778-1888)
Prince Eugenio, Count of Villafranca (1778–1785)
Prince Giuseppe Maria, Count of Villafranca (1785–1825)
Prince Eugenio Emanuele, Count of Villafranca (1816–1888)

Counts of Villafranca-Soissons (1888-present)
Emanuele Filiberto, Count of Villafranca-Soissons (1888–1933)
Eugenio Giuseppe, Count of Villafranca-Soissons (1933–1974)
Edoardo Emanuele Filiberto, Count of Villafranca-Soissons (1974–present)
First Heir presumptive: Leonardo Andrea of Villafranca-Soissons
Second Heir presumptive: Emanuele Filiberto of Villafranca-Soissons 
Third Heir presumptive: Gabriele Emilio Filiberto of Villafranca-Soissons 
Fourth Heir presumptive: Leopoldo Francesco of Villafranca-Soissons 
Fifth Heir presumptive: Daniel Alexis Eugenio Maria of Villafranca-Soissons 
Sixth Heir presumptive: Rolando of Villafranca-Soissons 
Seventh Heir presumptive: Carlo Alberto of Villafranca-Soissons 
Eighth Heir presumptive: Vittorio Orso of Villafranca-Soissons 

 
Counts of Soissons
Villafranca
Princes of Savoy
1778 establishments in Italy